Fune is a Local Government Area in Yobe State, Nigeria. It has an area of 4,948 km and a population of 300,760 at the 2006 census. The postal code of the area is 622.

Geography
The northeasterly line of equal latitude and longitude passes through the area including .

People
The main Settlement tribe of Fune Local Governments are Karai-Karai, Kanuri, Bura-Pabir, Ngizim, and Fulani. The Current Emir of Fune is Alhaji (Dr.) Saleh Idriss Ibn Uthman with his Palace situated at Damagum, the head quarter of Fune Local Government.

Historical Monuments
In 1987, the 8,000-year-old Dufuna canoe was discovered in Fune, near the village of Dufuna and the Komadugu Gana River.

See also 
 List of Local Government Areas in Yobe State

References

Local Government Areas in Yobe State